Nathan Astle is a former international cricketer who represented the New Zealand cricket team between 1995 and 2007. He scored centuries (100 or more runs in a single innings) in Test cricket and One Day International (ODI) matches on 11 and 16 occasions, respectively. Described by BBC Sport as "one of the best one-day batsmen New Zealand has ever produced", Astle is the fourth-highest run-scorer for his country in international cricket.

Astle made his ODI debut against the West Indies at Eden Park, Auckland, in January 1995. His first century came the same year against India at the Vidharba Cricket Association Ground, Nagpur. Opening the batting, he made 114 runs from 128 balls in the match which New Zealand won. He scored a century against England in the 1996 Cricket World Cup. Astle's match-winning innings of 119 against Pakistan was included among the 100 best ODI innings of all time by Wisden in 2002. He scored his second World Cup century when he made 102 against Zimbabwe in the 2003 tournament. His highest score of 145 not out was made against the United States in the 2004 Champions Trophy. In ODIs, Astle scored the most (five) centuries against India. He ended up in the nineties on nine occasions, including twice where he remained not out.

Astle made his Test debut against Zimbabwe in 1996, a year after he started playing international cricket. The same year he was picked up for the West Indies tour in which he scored back-to-back hundreds. His highest score of 222 (off 168 balls) was made against England at the Jade Stadium, Christchurch, in 2002. In the course of the innings, he set two records—fastest double-century scored in Test cricket, and the second-highest individual score in the fourth innings of a Test match. Astle played four Twenty20 International matches between 2005 and 2006 without scoring a century. His highest score in the format was 40 not out.

Key

ODI cricket centuries

Test cricket centuries

Notes and references
Notes

References

Astle, Nathan
Astle